Lake Kikila is a lake on the southeastern side of Wallis (Uvea) in the French overseas collectivity of Wallis and Futuna, South Pacific. It is marginally the second lake largest lake on the island after Lake Lalolalo, although is not rounded like Lalolalo. It lies to the just to the southwest of Falaleu and northwest of Ha'afuasia.

References

Lakes of Wallis and Futuna